Bernhard Wild (born 25 May 1931) is a Swiss bobsledder. He competed in the four-man event at the 1964 Winter Olympics.

References

External links
 

1931 births
Possibly living people
Swiss male bobsledders
Olympic bobsledders of Switzerland
Bobsledders at the 1964 Winter Olympics
Sportspeople from Zürich
20th-century Swiss people